Devèze is a commune in the Hautes-Pyrénées department in south-western France.

See also
Communes of the Hautes-Pyrénées department

References

External links
Official website of the commune of Devèze

Communes of Hautes-Pyrénées